Martin Alfonses Burke (January 28, 1905 in Toronto, Ontario – March 7, 1968)  was a defenceman in the National Hockey League for the Montreal Canadiens, Pittsburgh Pirates and Chicago Black Hawks. He was on two Stanley Cup championship teams in 1930 and 1931 with Montreal.

Burke may have been the first player to wear a helmet during an NHL game, donning one to protect an injured ear during a game in December 1928.

Career statistics

Regular season and playoffs

References

External links
 

1905 births
1968 deaths
Canadian ice hockey defencemen
Chicago Blackhawks players
Montreal Canadiens players
Ontario Hockey Association Senior A League (1890–1979) players
Ottawa Senators (1917) players
Pittsburgh Pirates (NHL) players
Ice hockey people from Toronto
Stanley Cup champions